Rhetus arcius is a species of Neotropical butterfly, first described in Carl Linnaeus' 1763 Centuria Insectorum.

References

Riodinini
Riodinidae of South America
Butterflies described in 1763
Taxa named by Carl Linnaeus